The discography of American rapper DaBaby consists of four studio albums, two extended plays, thirteen mixtapes, and 123 singles (including eighty-eight as a featured artist).

DaBaby, who was known as Baby Jesus at the time, released his debut mixtape NonFiction in 2015, he then released three more mixtapes from 2015 to 2016. He followed them up with his Baby Talk mixtape series. His thirteenth mixtape, Blank Blank was released in 2018.

DaBaby released his debut studio album, Baby on Baby in March 2019. It included his breakthrough hit single, "Suge", which reached number 7 on the US Billboard Hot 100, becoming his first entry on the chart. His second studio album, Kirk was released months later in September 2019, and became his first album to top the US Billboard 200 chart. In April 2020, he released his third album Blame It on Baby, which includes the chart-topping single "Rockstar", featuring Roddy Ricch. In November 2020, he released his first EP, titled My Brother's Keeper (Long Live G).

In 2021, DaBaby dropped multiple non-album singles and released his second EP, Back on My Baby Jesus Sh!t Again, which acted as a sequel to his 2017 mixtape Back On My Baby Jesus Shit.

In 2022, DaBaby collaborated with fellow rapper YoungBoy Never Broke Again on a mixtape, titled Better than You, which charted in the top 10 of the Billboard 200.

Albums

Studio albums

Collaborative mixtapes

Mixtapes

Extended plays

Singles

As lead artist

As featured artist

Other charted and certified songs

Guest appearances

Music videos

As lead artist

As featured artist

Notes

References 

Discographies of American artists